The 30th Women's Boat Race took place on 13 March 1975. The contest was between crews from the Universities of Oxford and Cambridge and held on the River Cam.

Background
The first Women's Boat Race was conducted on The Isis in 1927.

Crews
Cambridge's crew included five Blues while Oxford saw three rowers with Boat Race experience return.

Race
The race took place on the River Cam.  Cambridge won the toss and elected to start on the towpath side of the river.  They got off to the better start and were a length ahead after the first minute.  Oxford stayed in touch until the Railway Bridge, after which Cambridge pulled further ahead.

The contest was won by Cambridge by five lengths in a time of 4 minutes 7 seconds.  The victory took the overall record in the competition to 20–10 in their favour.

See also
The Boat Race 1975

References

External links
 Official website

Women's Boat Race
1975 in English sport
Boat
March 1975 sports events in the United Kingdom
1975 in women's rowing
1975 sports events in London